Salmonella Dub is a dub/drum n bass/reggae/roots band from New Zealand. The band was formed in 1992 by Andrew Penman, Dave Deakins, and Mark Tyler. The band has toured extensively throughout New Zealand, Australia, and Europe, including the UK and Ireland.

History
The original Salmonella Dub line-up was formed in 1992 in Christchurch. They played their first gig in January 1993 at the Westport racecourse. The 'Dubbies' have been called the pioneers and originators of a unique Pacific style of dub/drum 'n' bass/reggae/hip hop and groove-based rock containing elements of the Polynesian hip hop style known as Urban Pasifika, along with other influential 90s bands like Hallelujah Picassos, Nemesis Dub Systems, Unitone HiFi, and Supergroove. The band helped foster and tour acts like Fat Freddy’s Drop, Shapeshifter, Cornerstone Roots, Kora, and Trinity Roots, as well as the new wave of Australian acts like Budspells, Rastawookie, King Tide, Red Eyes, and the likes, can all thank Salmonella Dub for breaking new ground, in an Australasian alternative music scene which was dominated through most of the 1990s by straight guitar rock, and electronic dance music. For many years the band has been connected to the small north Canterbury town of Kaikoura, where they have their studio, and where they helped found the Kaikoura Roots festival.

The group worked for some time with MC Tiki Taane, who began mixing their live sets in 1996, and later joined the band onstage to rap, sing, and play guitar. After developing a profile with the band, Taane embarked on a solo career in 2007. Also in 2007 was the exit of saxophone player Conan Wilcox, the author of the dubs horn lines to that point.  Other guest or collaborative artists have included Paddy Free (of Pitch Black) who produced the most recent album release Freak Controller and performed with the band, and guests Whirimako Black, Hirini Melbourne, Richard Nunns and MC Mana.  The band has also collaborated with the New Zealand Symphony Orchestra and Hamish McKeich.

The recent touring entourage includes the originators: Andrew Penman, David Deakins, Mark Tyler with Guests, Michelle Harrison, The Mighty Asterix, Scotty Taitoko, Simon Kay, Brent Thompson, Laughton Kora.
In February 2008, Salmonella Dub and the New Zealand Symphony Orchestra collaborated for the Feel The Seasons Change tour of New Zealand with shows performed in Auckland, Wellington, Christchurch, and Nelson. The Feel The Seasons Change project combined Salmonella Dub’s contemporary music and production values with elements of Te Reo Māori, the ancient arts of taonga pūoro (traditional Maori instruments) and the New Zealand Symphony Orchestra's classical music tradition.

In the year 2000, the band won 8 Bnet awards for the L~bum Killervision alongside 4 awards at the NZ Tui awards. 
In 2002 their album Inside the Dubplates won 4 awards at the Tui's. The irony being the remix album Outside the Dubplates picked up the best downbeat album while the Bnet's rightly gave it the award for a best dance album.

Around this time there was much hoo haa from Brendan Smythe from Nz on Ear claiming the band had received over 280K in NZ on ear grants when in fact the band had received 150k in album funding which they paid back to the government due to the success of their sales.

"United by background images of our geography and history, the omnipresent birdsong of Richard Nunns on traditional Maori instruments, and the outstanding vocals of jazz-blues singer Whirimako Black, the collaboration was certainly intriguing if for its sheer scale. Between songs, conductor Hamish McKeich was careful not to trip over his players, squeezed onto two-thirds of the stage; Salmonella Dub looked oddly well-behaved and vulnerable standing next to them."

At the New Zealand Radio Awards in 2009, Radio New Zealand became the first noncommercial radio to win the Supreme Award including Best Technical Production, Studio, or Outside Broadcast Recording with Feel the Seasons Change – Live with the NZSO.

The band released the single "Same Home Town" in 2013 in honour of their 20th birthday. The single is dedicated to the Dux de Lux, the early Christchurch venue for the band.

Discography

Albums

EPs

Singles

DVDs

References

External links
 Salmonella Dub Official Site

New Zealand dub musical groups
Musical groups established in 1992
1992 establishments in New Zealand
Kaikōura